Yisroel Spira (November 12, 1889 – October 30, 1989), the Bluzhover Rebbe, was a senior member of Moetzes Gedolei HaTorah, and a Holocaust survivor. His experiences in the Nazi concentration camps were the basis for the book Hasidic Tales of the Holocaust.

Early life and family 
Spira was born in Reisha (Rzeszów), Galicia, southern Poland, to Yehoshua Spira, the "Keren Yehoshua" of Ribiditsch, and Tziporah. Yehoshua Spira was the son of Tzvi Elimelech Spira of Bluzhov (Błażowa in Polish) (1841–1924), also known by the eponym Tzvi LaTzaddik (Hebrew צבי לצדיק), after his major work. Tzvi Elimelech Spira was the son of the Tzemach Dovid (Heb. צמח דוד) of Dinov, who in turn was the son of Tzvi Elimelech Spira of Dynów (1783 – 1841), the author of Bnei Yisaschar (Heb. בני יששכר).

Spira married Perel Unger, the daughter of Shalom David Unger, the Zashavna Rebbe.

Career 
Spira was ordained at the young age of thirteen by the Maharsham of Brezan (Berezhany). He served as the rabbi of Pruchnik, and was later appointed rabbi of Ustrzyki Dolne, near Sanok, in southeastern Poland. After his father's death in 1931, Spira became Rebbe of Bluzhov.

World War II 
As a result of the Nazi occupation of Poland, the Jews were first herded into ghettos, then suffered deportation to destinations yet unknown. Spira was sent to the Janowska concentration camp. In October 1942, he was transferred to Bełżec, but he was subsequently able to escape back to Janowska. He would later be transferred to Bergen-Belsen

On October 31, 1942, Spira's wife Perel was killed by the Nazis. The rest of his family, among them his brothers, Rabbi Eliezer of Ribaditch, and Rabbi Meir of Bluzhev, were all killed by the Nazis.

On April 15, 1945, Spira was liberated from Bergen-Belsen.

After the war, Spira married his second wife, Rebbetzin Bronia Spira (Melchior) (b. June 2, 1910) from Sosnowiec. Her first husband, Rabbi Yisroel Avrohom Koshitzki, perished in the Bełżec extermination camp.

Post-war 
Spira relocated to the United States, at first settling in the Williamsburg section of Brooklyn, New York, and later in Borough Park.

Spira played an important role in the development of Agudath Israel of America.

Death 
Spira died on October 30, 1989. He was the senior member of the Moetzes Gedolei HaTorah. Rabbi Yitzchok Brandriss, spokesman for the Moetzes, said that Spira was the oldest living Hasidic Rabbi.

Spira was buried on the Mount of Olives in Jerusalem.

Legacy 
Stories about Spira's experiences during the Holocaust were told over to Holocaust researcher Yaffa Eliach. These stories would later become the basis for her book Hasidic Tales of the Holocaust.
 
In 2005, Spira's grandson, Rabbi Yoseph Spira, compiled two volumes of his grandfather's Torah thoughts, called Shufra Deyisroel  (Heb. שופרא דישראל). He also wrote a biography called LeAid Bivney Yisroel (Heb. לעד בבני ישראל).

See also 

 Yekusiel Yehudah Halberstam

References 

1891 births
1989 deaths
20th-century Polish rabbis
Hasidic rabbis in Europe
American Hasidic rabbis
Orthodox rabbis from New York City
People from Williamsburg, Brooklyn
Moetzes Gedolei HaTorah
Polish emigrants to the United States
Belzec extermination camp survivors
Bergen-Belsen concentration camp survivors
Burials at the Jewish cemetery on the Mount of Olives
People from Borough Park, Brooklyn